Shikdamakha (Tiwa village) is a village in the West Karbi Anglong district of Assam state  in North East India. It falls under the Amri development block and Vidhan Sabha No.20 Baithalangso ST LAC.

Geography 
Shikdamakha is at 25.9487°N 92.2237°E. It lies in the center of the Umswai Valley and is surrounded by hills, two of which are revered in Tiwa tradition: Palakhongor and Shabri Makha.

Demographics 
As per 2011 Population Census report, Shikdamakha is a home to 103 households. Shikdamakha has a population of 595 of which 321 are males and 274 are females. Inhabited by mainly Tiwa tribe people. The people of Shikdamakha are humble and hardworking and 75.15% are literate. It is a Christian dominated village.

Places of interest
Palakhongor:A tourists destination,  from the village. It offers a panoramic view of the scenic Umswai Valley. 
Each of these monoliths is a set of two stone slabs-one base and one body. The Tiwas plant one set every year to honor their ancestors.
Orchid garden:Visit the Orchid Garden which is just behind the Stadium and admire exceptional orchids that grow around and on trees with their long aerial roots.
Don Bosco Higher Secondary School,Umswai
Mary Mother of God Church,Umswai

Etymology 
The word Shikdamakha in Tiwa language means 'hillocks of traps'. The local folklore suggests that ghost used to trap humans.

Sanitation 
On 25 September 2016, the Government of Assam and the Public Health Engineering Department (PHED) named Shikdamakha the cleanliness village in the state. On 15 October 2016 the Karbi Anglong Autonomous Council (KAAC) declared Shikdamakha as the cleanest village of West Karbi Anglong District. Villagers use bamboo baskets for storing garbage in front of every household and every corner of the village, and the accumulated garbage is disposed at a regular intervals. Thrice in a week men and women take part in a community cleaning drive.

References

External links

 
 
Tourism in Northeast India
Villages in Karbi Anglong district
Tiwa (India)